Bezzia is a genus of biting midges in the family Ceratopogonidae. There are more than 310 described species in Bezzia.

See also
 List of Bezzia species

References

Further reading

External links

 

Ceratopogonidae
Articles created by Qbugbot
Chironomoidea genera